Thomas Adams (1583–1652) was an English clergyman and reputed preacher. He was called "The Shakespeare of the Puritans" by Robert Southey; while he was a Calvinist in theology, he is not, however, accurately described as a Puritan. He was for a time at Willington, Bedfordshire, and his works may later have been read by John Bunyan.

Life
Much of the information about Adams comes from title-pages and dedications in his works.

He was educated at the University of Cambridge, graduating B.A. in 1601 and M.A. in 1606. Ordained in 1604, he was a curate at Northill in Bedfordshire, a position he lost. By 1611, he was vicar of Willington.

On 21 December 1614 he became vicar of Wingrave, Buckinghamshire, a position he held until 1618. From 1618 to 1623 he held the preachership of St Gregory by St Paul's, and during the same period preached occasionally at St. Paul's Cross and Whitehall.

He was 'observant chaplain' to Henry Montagu, 1st Earl of Manchester, lord chief justice of England. Incidental references show that he was on intimate terms with William Herbert, 3rd Earl of Pembroke and Lord Ellesmere. Montagu was a dedicatee, as was Sir Henry Marten.

He was buried on 26 November 1652.

Works
Early sermons were Heaven and Earth Reconciled, and The Devil's Banquet. To Montagu he dedicated a work in 1618. In 1629 he collected into a massive folio his occasional sermons, a collection he dedicated to the parishioners of St Benet Paul's Wharf, and to the Lords Pembroke and Manchester. In 1638 appeared a long Commentary on the Second Epistle of St. Peter, dedicated to "Sir Henrie Marten, Knt."

Notes

References
Attribution

External links
Schaff-Herzog page
The Works of Thomas Adams (Nichol's Series of Standard Divines, Edinburgh 1861 onwards) in three volumes Volume I: Old Testament, Volume II: New Testament, Volume III: New Testament and Meditations on the Creed
The Sermons of Thomas Adams selected by John Brown (1909) 

1583 births
1652 deaths
17th-century English Anglican priests
English Calvinist and Reformed ministers
English male writers
17th-century Calvinist and Reformed ministers
Alumni of Trinity College, Cambridge